Naonobu (written: 直円 or 尚信) is a masculine Japanese given name. Notable people with the name include:

, Japanese mathematician
, Japanese painter
, Japanese diplomat
, Japanese volleyball player

See also
Naonobu (crater), a lunar impact crater

Japanese masculine given names